Nobuya Osodo (born 28 June 1983), is a Japanese futsal player who plays for Shriker Osaka and the Japanese national futsal team.

Title 
 Club
 F.League (1) : 2016-17
 All Japan Futsal Championship (1) : 2017

 Individual
 F.League Special Award (1) : 2008-09
 F.League Best 5 (2) : 2012-13, 2013-14

 Japan National Futsal Team
 AFC Futsal Championship (1) : 2012

References

External links
FIFA profile

1983 births
Living people
Japanese men's futsal players
Shriker Osaka players
People from Saitama Prefecture